Rhoptropella is a monotypic genus of lizard in the family Gekkonidae. The genus is indigenous to southern Africa.

Species
The sole species in the genus Rhoptropella is Rhoptropella ocellata, although its generic allocation is debated.

Common names
R. ocellata is known commonly as the Namaqua day gecko, the ocellated day gecko, and the spotted day gecko.

Geographic range
R. ocellata is found in southwestern Namibia and South Africa (Little Namaqualand).

Habitat
The preferred natural habitats of R. ocellata are desert and shrubland.

Description

Reproduction
R. ocellata is oviparous. Adult females lay clutches of 1–2 hard-shelled eggs. Each egg measures 8.5 by 6.5 mm (0.33 by 0.26 in).

References

Further reading
Boulenger GA (1885). "Descriptions of three new Species of Geckos". Annals and Magazine of Natural History, Fifth Series 16: 473–475. (Rhoptropus ocellatus, new species, p. 475).
Hewitt J (1937). "Descriptions of South African lizards". Annals of the Natal Museum 8 (2): 199–209. (Rhoptropella, new genus; R. ocellata, new combination).
Rocha S, Rösler H, Gehring P-S, Glaw F, Posada D, Harris DJ, Vences M (2010). "Phylogenetic systematics of day geckos, genus Phelsuma, based on molecular and morphological data (Squamata: Gekkonidae)". Zootaxa 2429: 1–28. (Rhoptropella ocellata).
Schmidt KP (1933). "The Reptiles of the Pulitzer Angola Expedition". Annals of the Carnegie Museum 22 (1): 1–15. (Phelsuma ocellata, new combination).

Gekkonidae
Reptiles of Namibia
Reptiles of South Africa
Taxa named by John Hewitt (herpetologist)
Taxa named by George Albert Boulenger
Taxonomy articles created by Polbot
Taxobox binomials not recognized by IUCN